Vasto is a comune on the Adriatic coast of the Province of Chieti, in southern Abruzzo, Italy. During the Middle Ages it was called dGuastaymonis,  Vasto d'Aimone or Waste d'Aimone. Fascist Italy called the city Istonio, but it has been renamed Vasto in 1944.

History

Ancient period
According to legend, the town was founded by Diomedes, the Greek hero. The earliest archaeological relics date to 1300 BC.

Ancient geographers cited the town as located in the territory of the Frentani and apparently under Julius Caesar did not obtain the rank of a colonia, but continued to bear the title of a municipium, as we learn from some inscriptions. 
Under the Roman Empire, the municipium of Histonium was a flourishing and opulent town, further attested by the existing ruins of an ancient Roman theatre, baths, and other public edifices, besides numerous mosaics, statues, and columns of granite or marble.
 
Among the numerous inscriptions which have been found, one of the most curious records the fact of a young boy named Lucius Valerius Pudens having at thirteen years of age won the prize for Latin poetry in the contest held at Rome in the temple of Jupiter Capitolinus. The name of Histonium is still found in the Itineraries of the fourth century and it probably never ceased to exist on its present site, though ravaged successively by the Goths, the Lombards, the Franks, and the Arabs.

Middle Ages

After the collapse of the Western Roman Empire, the region was occupied by Germanic tribes until Justinian's Byzantine re-conquest, which included the province of Samnium, of which Histonium was a key town.  However soon after Justinian's death, Histonium fell to the Lombards and incorporated into the Duchy of Benevento. Later, circa 774 AD, the town was conquered by the Franks. Subsequently, in 1053, the Normans under Robert Guiscard in turn captured it along with the Duchy of Benevento. Around 1076, Histonium was renamed Guastaymonis, or the Waste of Aimone, following raids, hence its current name. From the 13th century it was part of the Kingdom of Naples, which later merged into the Kingdom of the Two Sicilies.

In the 15th century the city's urban structure was transformed by the condottiero Giacomo Caldora, who had become its lord. The Caldora family built new city walls still seen today, including the Torre Bassano tower in Piazza Rossetti, the Torre Diomede in Vico Storto del Passero, the Torre Diamante in Piazza Verdi and Porta Catena, and with Castello Caldoresco as its primary defensive outpost.

In 1566, Turkish Ottoman naval forces, led by Piyale Pasha, destroyed much of the city by fire, including the Castello Caldoresco, the Church of Santa Margherita and the Palazzo d'Avalos (formerly a home of Vittoria Colonna - close confidante of Michelangelo - now the Musei di Palazzo d'Avalos).

From Spanish rule until Italy's Unification
Under the Spanish rule of southern Italy, Vasto became fief of the Marquis d'Avalos, and under the reign of Cesare Michelangelo (marquis from 1697 to 1729), Vasto reached its zenith. Only superficially shaken by revolutionary events in 1799 (a short-lived Republic of Vasto was immediately overthrown by the sanfedista, or loyalists), the city's history was reflected in the nation's throughout the Restoration to the Unity of Italy when a liberal elite governed.

The poet and scholar Gabriele Rossetti was born in Vasto on 28 February 1783. Rossetti's published works include literary criticism, Romantic poetry such as his long poem Il Veggente in Solitudine of 1846, and his autobiography. Gabriele went into political exile in 1821, settling in London, England.

He was the father of well-known pre-Raphaelite painter Dante Gabriel Rossetti and poet Christina Rossetti. Gabriele died on 24 April 1854 and is buried in London's Highgate Cemetery with his wife Frances Polidori.

Modern
In the early 20th century, Vasto changed its architectural and urban features. The historical centre was redrawn and the foundations were set for drastic alterations during the 1920s and 1930s, with Mussolini decreeing a name change to Istonio in 1938, the official name until the liberation of the city from the Allied Forces in 1944.

Despite a devastating landslide (1956) that dragged a significant part of the eastern ridge - now Via Adriatica - into the gorge below, the years following World War II witnessed industrial, urban, and socio-cultural development. The city also discovered its tourist vocation: besides the progressive development of its beaches in Marina di Vasto, Roman-era thermal baths, mosaics, cisterns and remains of an amphitheatre were found and restored.

During the 1970s until the recent days, the town underwent a remarkable change and a fast growth, with several housing, road and other infrastructure projects built to accommodate the emigrating population from the inner areas of Southern Abruzzo, which have made it one of the most populous of the region.

Main sights 
 
The old part of the town (centro storico) features a number of  buildings and churches dating from the 12th-18th centuries, including:
Vasto Cathedral (Cattedrale di San Giuseppe)
Santa_Maria_Maggiore: largest and oldest (mentioned in a document as early as 1195) church in the town, with a quite tall bell tower. Damaged by the Turks in 1566, and by a fire in 1645, it received a thorough restructuring in 1735 in which it got the current shape. It hosts one of alleged Jesus' crown of thorns (Sacra Spina).
Castello Caldoresco
D'Avalos Palace (Palazzo D'Avalos) and the Musei Civici

Below the hill on which the town is located, the beach resort town of Marina di Vasto offers a large sandy beach and several hotels and other facilities.  

Further north the coast becomes rocky and features interesting pebble and stone beaches and coves, as well as the typical trabocchi, typical wooden fishing machines of the Southern Abruzzo coast. 
Amongst the natural areas, also featuring a number of sandy and rocky beaches, is the protected natural area of the  Riserva Naturale di Punta Aderci, whose beaches were voted in 2014 third of the top 20 beaches in Italy.

Twinnings
 Perth, Australia, since 1989

Notable people from Vasto
Gabriele Rossetti, a scholar, and founder of the secret society Carbonari. 
Vittorio Coccia, football player
Luca Dirisio, singer
Andrea Iannone, motorcycle racer
Valerico Laccetti, painter
Filippo Palizzi, painter
Francesco Romani, doctor
Giuseppe Spataro, politician

See also
Vastese A Romance language from this town
Punta Penna Lighthouse

References

External links 

 
  
 News and videos from Vasto Italy

 
Coastal towns in Abruzzo
Adriatic Sea